Murray Middle School (formerly called Murray Junior High School) is a junior high school and a former high school in Saint Paul, Minnesota, United States. The school is part of the Saint Paul Public Schools district. As of 2022 the principal is Jamin Mackenzie

History
In February 1926, Murray opened as a neighborhood school with 37 classrooms and a jungle gym. Grades and -7-12 were taught with a total of 200 students enrolled. In 1930, it nearly doubled in size. A new wing was also added. January 1940 saw the opening of the auditorium wing and the science labs underneath. 850 students were then enrolled in grades 7-12. The first graduating class was in June 1940.

During 1963 a new building was added with new gym and bathhouse, pool, and science facilities to reduce overcrowding and double shifts caused by the "baby-boomer" Class of 1964. 1,100 were then enrolled. Murray continued to include grades 7-12.

In early 1979, a new library opened. The last graduating class was in June 1979. Murray opened in 1979 as a general magnet for grades 7-9. In September 1980. it was changed to a 7-8 magnet school. When Murray High School became a junior high school, Como Park Junior High School became Como Park Senior High School and most students went there or to Central High School. In September 1986, the science-math magnet began. Serving grades 7-8. A new front entry, new offices and two new classrooms were built in 2000.

In the 2006-2007 school year, Murray had 800 enrolled students.

This school is not to be confused with Hill-Murray School,  a private, Catholic high school located just outside St. Paul.

References

External links
Official website
Class of 1959
Class of 1964
Class of 1969

Education in Saint Paul, Minnesota
Magnet schools in Minnesota
Public middle schools in Minnesota
Schools in Ramsey County, Minnesota